In statistics, the Wishart distribution is a generalization to multiple dimensions of the gamma distribution. It is named in honor of John Wishart, who first formulated the distribution in 1928.

It is a family of probability distributions defined over symmetric, nonnegative-definite random matrices (i.e. matrix-valued random variables). In random matrix theory, the space of Wishart matrices is called the Wishart ensemble.

These distributions are of great importance in the estimation of covariance matrices in multivariate statistics. In Bayesian statistics, the Wishart distribution is the conjugate prior of the inverse covariance-matrix  of a multivariate-normal random-vector.

Definition
Suppose  is a  matrix, each column of which is independently drawn from a -variate normal distribution with zero mean:

Then the Wishart distribution is the probability distribution of the  random matrix 

known as the scatter matrix. One indicates that  has that probability distribution by writing

The positive integer  is the number of degrees of freedom.  Sometimes this is written . For  the matrix  is invertible with probability  if  is invertible.

If  then this distribution is a chi-squared distribution with  degrees of freedom.

Occurrence
The Wishart distribution arises as the distribution of the sample covariance matrix for a sample from a multivariate normal distribution.  It occurs frequently in likelihood-ratio tests in multivariate statistical analysis.  It also arises in the spectral theory of random matrices and in multidimensional Bayesian analysis. It is also encountered in wireless communications, while analyzing the performance of Rayleigh fading MIMO wireless channels .

Probability density function
The Wishart distribution can be characterized by its probability density function as follows:

Let  be a  symmetric matrix of random variables that is positive semi-definite. Let  be a (fixed) symmetric positive definite matrix of size .

Then, if ,  has a Wishart distribution with  degrees of freedom if it has the probability density function

Also, the density formula above applies only to positive definite matrices  for other matrices the density is equal to zero.

The joint-eigenvalue density for the eigenvalues  of a random matrix  is,

 

where is a constant.

In fact the above definition can be extended to any real .  If , then the Wishart no longer has a density—instead it represents a singular distribution that takes values in a lower-dimension subspace of the space of  matrices.

Use in Bayesian statistics
In Bayesian statistics, in the context of the multivariate normal distribution, the Wishart distribution is the conjugate prior to the precision matrix , where  is the covariance matrix.

Choice of parameters
The least informative, proper Wishart prior is obtained by setting .

Properties

Log-expectation
The following formula plays a role in variational Bayes derivations for Bayes networks
involving the Wishart distribution:

where  is the multivariate digamma function (the derivative of the log of the multivariate gamma function).

Log-variance
The following variance computation could be of help in Bayesian statistics:

 

where  is the trigamma function. This comes up when computing the Fisher information of the Wishart random variable.

Entropy
The information entropy of the distribution has the following formula:

where  is the normalizing constant of the distribution:

This can be expanded as follows:

Cross-entropy

Note that when  and we recover the entropy.

KL-divergence

Characteristic function
The characteristic function of the Wishart distribution is

where  denotes expectation. Properly interpreting this formula requires a little care, because noninteger complex powers are multivalued; when  is noninteger, the correct branch must be determined via analytic continuation.

Theorem

Corollary 1
If  is a nonzero  constant vector, then:

Corollary 2
Consider the case where  (that is, the -th element is one and all others zero). Then corollary 1 above shows that

gives the marginal distribution of each of the elements on the matrix's diagonal.

George Seber points out that the Wishart distribution is not called the “multivariate chi-squared distribution” because the marginal distribution of the off-diagonal elements is not chi-squared. Seber prefers to reserve the term multivariate for the case when all univariate marginals belong to the same family.

Estimator of the multivariate normal distribution
The Wishart distribution is the sampling distribution of the maximum-likelihood estimator (MLE) of the covariance matrix of a multivariate normal distribution. A derivation of the MLE uses the spectral theorem.

Bartlett decomposition
The Bartlett decomposition of a matrix  from a -variate Wishart distribution with scale matrix  and  degrees of freedom is the factorization:

where  and  independently. This provides a useful method for obtaining random samples from a Wishart distribution.

Marginal distribution of matrix elements
Let  be a  variance matrix characterized by correlation coefficient  and  its lower Cholesky factor:

Multiplying through the Bartlett decomposition above, we find that a random sample from the  Wishart distribution is

The diagonal elements, most evidently in the first element, follow the  distribution with  degrees of freedom (scaled by ) as expected.  The off-diagonal element is less familiar but can be identified as a normal variance-mean mixture where the mixing density is a  distribution.  The corresponding marginal probability density for the off-diagonal element is therefore the variance-gamma distribution

where  is the modified Bessel function of the second kind. Similar results may be found for higher dimensions, but the interdependence of the off-diagonal correlations becomes increasingly complicated.  It is also possible to write down the moment-generating function even in the noncentral case (essentially the nth power of Craig (1936) equation 10) although the probability density becomes an infinite sum of Bessel functions.

The range of the shape parameter
It can be shown  that the Wishart distribution can be defined if and only if the shape parameter  belongs to the set

This set is named after Gindikin, who introduced it in the 1970s in the context of gamma distributions on homogeneous cones. However, for the new parameters in the discrete spectrum of the Gindikin ensemble, namely,

the corresponding Wishart distribution has no Lebesgue density.

Relationships to other distributions
 In Bayesian statistics, the Wishart distribution is a conjugate prior for the precision parameter of the multivariate normal distribution, when the mean parameter is known.
 A generalization is the multivariate gamma distribution.
 A different type of generalization is the normal-Wishart distribution, essentially the product of a multivariate normal distribution with a Wishart distribution.

See also

 Chi-squared distribution
 Complex Wishart distribution
 F-distribution
 Gamma distribution
 Hotelling's T-squared distribution
 Inverse-Wishart distribution
 Multivariate gamma distribution
 Student's t-distribution
 Wilks' lambda distribution

References

External links
 A C++ library for random matrix generator

Continuous distributions
Multivariate continuous distributions
Covariance and correlation
Random matrices
Conjugate prior distributions
Exponential family distributions